Robbie Crawford (born 22 June 1994) is a Scottish footballer who plays as a central midfielder for Greenock Morton. He has previously played for Ayr United, Livingston, Motherwell and Partick Thistle.

Career
After making more than 200 appearances for Ayr United, on 15 June 2019 Crawford joined Scottish Premiership side Livingston on a two-year deal.

On 18 September 2020, Crawford signed on loan for Motherwell until January 2021. He moved to Motherwell on a permanent basis on 1 February 2021.

On 2 April 2021, Crawford signed a one-year contract extension with Motherwell.

On 7 January 2022, Crawford signed a 6-month contract with Scottish Championship side Partick Thistle.

Crawford signed for Greenock Morton in August 2022, scoring his first goal in a 2-1 away victory against Cove Rangers

Career statistics

References

External links

1994 births
Living people
Footballers from Irvine, North Ayrshire
Scottish footballers
Association football midfielders
Ayr United F.C. players
Scottish Football League players
Scottish Professional Football League players
Livingston F.C. players
Motherwell F.C. players
Partick Thistle F.C. players
Greenock Morton F.C. players